The Nebraska Northeastern Railway  was a shortline railroad that began operations on July 23, 1996, in northeastern Nebraska.  It operates on about 120 miles of former Burlington Northern Railroad track between Ferry Station, NE and O'Neill, Nebraska, as well as trackage rights over the BNSF Railway, Burlington Northern's successor, into Sioux City, Iowa.

In October 2012, The Federal Surface Transportation Board approved the BNSF Railway to buy back the Nebraska Northeastern for an undisclosed sum.  The Nebraska Northeastern line would serve to optimize grain traffic through the region for the BNSF, and also serves three major ethanol production facilities: Siouxland Ethanol LLC in Jackson, Neb.; NEDAK Ethanol in Atkinson, Neb.; and Husker Ag Inc. in Plainview, Neb.

References

Nebraska railroads
Spin-offs of the Burlington Northern Railroad